Larry Reed may refer to:
Larry Reed (puppeteer), shadow puppeteer
Lawrence Reed, president of the Foundation for Economic Education
Larry Reed, bassist with Shoot Low Sheriff

See also
Larry Reid (disambiguation)